is a passenger railway station in located in the city of  Moriguchi, Osaka Prefecture, Japan, operated by the private railway company Keihan Electric Railway.

Lines
Takii Station is served by the  Keihan Main Line, and is located 7.2 km from the starting point of the line at Yodoyabashi Station.

Station layout
The station has two elevated side platforms, serving 4 tracks with the station building underneath.The middle two tracks are for express trains passing through the station

Platforms

Adjacent stations

History
The station was opened on October 14, 1931.

Passenger statistics
In fiscal 2019, the station was used by an average of 6,814 passengers daily.

Surrounding area
 Kansai Medical University Medical Center
 Osaka International Takii High School
 Moriguchi City Takai Elementary School

See also
List of railway stations in Japan

References

External links

Official home page 

Railway stations in Japan opened in 1931
Railway stations in Osaka Prefecture
Moriguchi, Osaka